Dhammika Niroshana (born 22 February 1983), is a former Sri Lankan cricketer. He made his debut for the Sri Lanka Under 19s against Singapore in 2000. He continued playing Under 19 Test and ODI cricket for 2 years (captaining the side on ten occasions, but winning only one match) before making his senior First-class debut; for the Sri Lanka Schools XI. He went on to appear in domestic Sri Lankan cricket for Chilaw Marians Cricket Club and Galle Cricket Club.

He played as a bowler, with a healthy bowling average of under 30 in First-class, List A and both Under 19 forms of the game.

References

Sri Lankan cricketers
1983 births
Living people
Galle Cricket Club cricketers
Chilaw Marians Cricket Club cricketers
Sri Lanka Schools XI cricketers
Cricketers from Galle